Bidan Sarzeh (also Romanized as Bīdān Sarzeh) is a village in Eskelabad Rural District, Nukabad District, Khash County, Sistan and Baluchestan Province, Iran. At the 2006 census, its population was 60, in 15 families.

References 

Populated places in Khash County